Power from the Eastside is a compilation album from Various Trance and Techno artists, released on 1 September 2003 in Germany.

History
All tracks are popular East Music songs from popular Ostrock, Schlager music bands like Karat, Silly, Nina Hagen, Puhdys and many more, under the DJs are Scooter, Westbam, DJ Quicksilver and few others.

Track list

Credits
Tracks 1, 3, 5, 10 published by Harth Musikverlag
Track 12 published by Harth Musikverlag / Echo Musikverlag
Track 7 published by PlatinSong Musikverlag
Track 8 published by Lied der Zeit Musikverlag
Track 16 published by Lied der Zeit Musikverlag / Roba Musikverlag

All other Tracks copyright Control.

Master by C. Zippel / Berlin Mastering
 Compilation Concept and Realisation by Jörg Stempel and Robert Andrä

Bonus material
On the Bonus CD-ROM is the complete Magix Music Maker Remix software.

Notes and references

External links
 Discogs Entry

DJ mix album series
2003 compilation albums